Burrows Glacier is a hanging glacier on the south wall of Garwood Valley and opposite the Garwood Glacier in the Denton Hills. The glacier provides the water and nutrients for the existence of the Nostoc beds below. Named by the New Zealand Geographic Board in 2002 after Emeritus Professor Colin Burrows, sometime teacher in the Department of Plant and Microbial Sciences, University of Canterbury.

References

Glaciers of Victoria Land